MTV2 Headbangers Ball is a heavy metal compilation album released in conjunction with the MTV program Headbangers Ball. It is the first in a series of compilations and was released approximately five months after the program re-debuted on MTV2. The first disc consists largely of singles by mainstream bands, while the second disc features lesser known groups of intense musical style. Nearly all the tracks had a music video which aired on Headbangers Ball in 2003.

Track listing

Chart performance

References 

2003 compilation albums
Heavy metal compilation albums

pl:MTV2 Headbangers Ball